Rosedale is a census-designated place (CDP) in Kern County, California, United States. The population was 14,058 at the 2010 census, up from 8,445 at the 2000 census.

Geography

History
Rosedale was founded in 1891 as a colony of English farmers. A post office operated at Rosedale from 1891 to 1913.

Demographics

2010
At the 2010 census Rosedale had a population of 14,058. The racial makeup of Rosedale was 11,695 (83.2%) White, 208 (1.5%) African American, 159 (1.1%) Native American, 389 (2.8%) Asian, 24 (0.2%) Pacific Islander, 997 (7.1%) from other races, and 586 (4.2%) from two or more races. Hispanic or Latino of any race were 2,495 persons (17.7%).

The census reported that 14,049 people (99.9% of the population) lived in households, 9 (0.1%) lived in non-institutionalized group quarters, and no one was institutionalized.

There were 4,565 households, 1,941 (42.5%) had children under the age of 18 living in them, 3,386 (74.2%) were opposite-sex married couples living together, 290 (6.4%) had a female householder with no husband present, 208 (4.6%) had a male householder with no wife present.  There were 171 (3.7%) unmarried opposite-sex partnerships, and 35 (0.8%) same-sex married couples or partnerships. 522 households (11.4%) were one person and 161 (3.5%) had someone living alone who was 65 or older. The average household size was 3.08.  There were 3,884 families (85.1% of households); the average family size was 3.32.

The age distribution was 3,811 people (27.1%) under the age of 18, 1,223 people (8.7%) aged 18 to 24, 3,124 people (22.2%) aged 25 to 44, 4,642 people (33.0%) aged 45 to 64, and 1,258 people (8.9%) who were 65 or older.  The median age was 40.1 years. For every 100 females, there were 99.0 males.  For every 100 females age 18 and over, there were 97.4 males.

There were 4,799 housing units at an average density of 141.3 per square mile, of the occupied units 4,106 (89.9%) were owner-occupied and 459 (10.1%) were rented. The homeowner vacancy rate was 1.6%; the rental vacancy rate was 9.4%.  12,647 people (90.0% of the population) lived in owner-occupied housing units and 1,402 people (10.0%) lived in rental housing units.

2000
At the 2000 census there were 8,445 people, 2,566 households, and 2,304 families living in the CDP. The racial makeup of the CDP was 88.98% White, 1.22% Black or African American, 1.22% Native American, 1.36% Asian, 0.04% Pacific Islander, 4.30% from other races, and 2.89% from two or more races.  11.00% of the population were Hispanic or Latino of any race.
Of the 2,566 households 49.6% had children under the age of 18 living with them, 80.4% were married couples living together, 5.8% had a female householder with no husband present, and 10.2% were non-families. 7.8% of households were one person and 2.6% were one person aged 65 or older.  The average household size was 3.28 and the average family size was 3.45.

The age distribution was 33.3% under the age of 18, 6.4% from 18 to 24, 28.7% from 25 to 44, 25.6% from 45 to 64, and 6.0% 65 or older.  The median age was 37 years. For every 100 females, there were 98.0 males.  For every 100 females age 18 and over, there were 96.7 males.

The median household income was $76,277 and the median family income  was $83,704. Males had a median income of $61,379 versus $33,750 for females. The per capita income for the CDP was $25,414.  About 4.5% of families and 6.3% of the population were below the poverty line, including 7.4% of those under age 18 and 2.8% of those age 65 or over.

References

Census-designated places in Kern County, California
Populated places established in 1891
1891 establishments in California
Census-designated places in California